Houhora is a locality and harbour on the east side of the Aupouri Peninsula of Northland, New Zealand. Waihopo, Te Raupo, Pukenui, Raio and Houhora Heads are associated localities on the southern shores of the harbour. State Highway 1 passes through all these localities except for Houhora Heads. Te Kao is 24 km north west, and Waiharara is 22 km south east.

The harbour is long and narrow, mostly sheltered, with exposed sand banks at low tide. There is a deep channel along the southern shore as far as Pukenui Wharf. Tohoraha / Mount Camel (also called Mt Houhora) is a 236-metre hill forming the north head. The south head is flat.

History
Houhora Mountain was the first part of New Zealand that the early explorer Kupe saw, but he thought it was a whale, according to Māori legend. Houhora was a Māori base settlement in the early 14th century. Snapper, seals, dolphins, moa and other birds were food sources.

James Cook named Mt Camel, on the north head of Houhora Harbour, on 10 December 1769. He described it in his log as "a high mountain or hill standing upon a desert shore."

Te Houtaewa was a Te Aupōuri athlete who was killed at Pukenui during the Musket Wars of the early 19th century.

In the 19th century, Houhora Harbour provisioned whalers, and residents mounted their own whaling expeditions in open boats. Three families – Wagener, Subritzky and Yates – settled in the area to farm and trade. The Subritzky family, who arrived near Motueka in 1843, claim to be New Zealand's first Polish settlers. They moved to Australia and then to Houhora Heads. Their homestead there took two years to build in the 1860s. It was sold to a member of the Wagener family in 1897.  The homestead, now largely restored, is open to the public. The Wagener Museum at Houhora Heads, built by W. E. Wagener, was built near the homestead. It contained an eclectic collection of artefacts, but closed in 2003 and a substantial part of the collection was sold off.

A lifeboat from SS Elingamite, which was wrecked on the Three Kings Islands on 9 November 1902, arrived in Houhora the following day with 52 survivors. One of the whalers immediately was dispatched to intercept any vessel along the coast to divert it to the Three Kings. This mission was successful.

In the latter 19th century and early 20th century, land around Houhora was used for the kauri gum digging trade. By the 1910s, the kauri gum industry was centred in Houhora and Ahipara.

Demographics
The SA1 area is part of the larger North Cape statistical area.

The SA1 statistical area had a population of 174 at the 2018 New Zealand census, an increase of 30 people (20.8%) since the 2013 census, and an increase of 63 people (56.8%) since the 2006 census. There were 60 households, comprising 78 males and 93 females, giving a sex ratio of 0.84 males per female. The median age was 50.2 years (compared with 37.4 years nationally), with 42 people (24.1%) aged under 15 years, 18 (10.3%) aged 15 to 29, 78 (44.8%) aged 30 to 64, and 30 (17.2%) aged 65 or older.

Ethnicities were 48.3% European/Pākehā, 58.6% Māori, and 6.9% Pacific peoples. People may identify with more than one ethnicity.

Of those people who chose to answer the census's question about religious affiliation, 31.0% had no religion, 44.8% were Christian and 6.9% had Māori religious beliefs.

Of those at least 15 years old, 6 (4.5%) people had a bachelor or higher degree, and 36 (27.3%) people had no formal qualifications. The median income was $21,600, compared with $31,800 nationally. 9 people (6.8%) earned over $70,000 compared to 17.2% nationally. The employment status of those at least 15 was that 48 (36.4%) people were employed full-time, 18 (13.6%) were part-time, and 6 (4.5%) were unemployed.

Notable people
Lloyd Trigg, a pilot in the RNZAF during World War II, and Victoria Cross recipient.

Notes

External links

Far North District
Populated places in the Northland Region